Güines Municipal Museum is a museum located in the 77th street in Güines, Cuba. It was established on 17 February 1982.

The museum holds collections on history, weaponry, numismatics and decorative arts.

See also 
 List of museums in Cuba

References 

Museums in Cuba
Museum
Buildings and structures in Mayabeque Province
Museums established in 1982
1982 establishments in Cuba
20th-century architecture in Cuba